Constellations is the third studio album by American metalcore band August Burns Red. It was released on July 14, 2009, through Solid State Records and was produced by Jason Suecof.

Background 

The album was released on July 14, 2009 through Solid State Records.

Composition

Influences, style and themes 
 
The song "Indonesia", which features guest vocals from Tommy Giles Rogers of Between the Buried and Me, was made as a tribute to David Clapper, a missionary who died in a plane crash in Indonesia. He lived in Lancaster, Pennsylvania, the city in which August Burns Red began.

The song "Marianas Trench" is featured in the rhythm game, Rock Band 2, via the Rock Band Network.

Release and promotion 

On the band's Myspace page, they released four singles from the album, "Thirty and Seven" and "Existence," with "Thirty and Seven" available for download on the iTunes Store. "Ocean of Apathy", the third track from the then-upcoming album, was released on Monday June 29, 2009. "Meddler" was released on July 6, 2009 and was shown on the band's Myspace. On July 7, 2009, the band posted the entire album on their Myspace page. They then would sell the album days ahead of the release at the beginning of their tour with Enter Shikari, Iwrestledabearonce and Blessthefall, starting with the Recher Theatre in Towson, Maryland on July 10, 2009.

Commercial performance 

The album was at No. 24 on the Billboard 200 with sales of 20,401 copies in its first week. The album also has a bonus 7-inch vinyl record, that contained an alternate version of "Indonesia" and a cover of the NOFX song, "Linoleum", as a special gift when pre-ordering through a select dealer. A second 7-inch vinyl, O Come, O Come, Emmanuel, was released on November 10, 2009 by August Burns Red's former label, CI Records. The vinyl editions were limited to 1,000 colored discs, 400 of which were green, 400 of which were red, and 200 of which were split-colored red and green.

Accolades 

In 2010, Constellations was nominated for a Dove Award for Rock Album of the Year at the 41st GMA Dove Awards.

Track listing

Personnel 
August Burns Red
 Jake Luhrs – lead vocals
 J.B. Brubaker – lead guitar
 Brent Rambler – rhythm guitar
 Dustin Davidson – bass guitar, backing vocals
 Matt Greiner – drums, piano

Additional musicians
 Tommy Giles Rogers Jr. of Between the Buried and Me – guest vocals on track 7, "Indonesia"

Additional personnel
 Jason Suecof – producer and mixing
 Devin Townsend – additional mixing 
 Troy Glessner – mastering 
 Ryan Clark of Invisible Creature – artwork
 Jonathan Dunn – A&R

References

August Burns Red albums
2009 albums
Solid State Records albums